Giannis Apostolidis (born 14 October 1988) is Assistant Team Manager of Doxa Drama F.C. and a Team Manager of U19. Giannis is a former professional football midfielder who played for Makedonikos F.C. in the Gamma Ethniki. He previously played for Panetolikos in the Greek third division, on loan from Skoda Xanthi F.C.

References

1988 births
Living people
Greek footballers
Xanthi F.C. players
Panetolikos F.C. players
Association football defenders
Footballers from Xanthi